Beamer is a surname. Notable people with this surname include the following:

 Adrian L. Beamer (1923-2008), American football player
 Diane Beamer (born 1960), Australian politician
 Frank Beamer (born 1946), American football coach
 George N. Beamer (1904–1974), United States federal judge
 Helen Desha Beamer (1882-1952), Hawaiian musician
 Jacob R. Beamer (born 1810), Canadian military personnel
 John V. Beamer (1896–1964), Representative from Indiana in the US Congress
 Keola Beamer (born 1951), Hawaiian guitar player, son of Winona
 Lisa Beamer (born 1969), American writer
 Mahi Beamer (1928-2017), Hawaiian musician
 Nub Beamer (born 1936), American football player
 Shane Beamer (born 1977), son of Frank, also an American football coach
 Tim Beamer (born 1948), African-American football player
 Todd Beamer (1968–2001), victim of the September 11th attacks
 Winona Beamer (1923-2008), Hawaiian preservationist, mother of Keola

See also
 Beemer (surname)